The 1924 Cal Poly Mustangs football team represented California Polytechnic School—now known as California Polytechnic State University, San Luis Obispo—as a member of the California Coast Conference (CCC) during the 1924 college football season. Led by fourth-year head coach Al Agosti, Cal Poly compiled an overall record of 1–5 with a mark of 0–3 in conference play. The team was outscored by its opponents 193 to 19 for the season and was shut out by the Stanford freshmen, 97–0. The Mustangs played home games in San Luis Obispo, California.

Cal Poly was a two-year school until 1941.

Schedule

References

Cal Poly
Cal Poly Mustangs football seasons
Cal Poly Mustangs football